Abram van Heerden (7 September 1927 – 3 September 2021) was a South African sprinter. He competed in the men's 100 metres at the 1948 Summer Olympics. He died on 3 September 2021, at the age of 93.

Competition record

References

External links
 

1927 births
2021 deaths
Athletes (track and field) at the 1948 Summer Olympics
South African male sprinters
Olympic athletes of South Africa
Place of birth missing